Hougham railway station is a former railway station in Hougham, Lincolnshire. The station was about a mile east of the village of Hougham itself and was part of the Great Northern Railway.  The station was opened on 15 July 1852.

The closure of the station was announced on 17 August 1957 by the British Transport Commission, who confirmed that the station would be declared 'uneconomic' and passenger train services were withdrawn on 16 September 1957 as well as Claypole.

References

Disused railway stations in Lincolnshire
Former Great Northern Railway stations
Railway stations in Great Britain opened in 1852
Railway stations in Great Britain closed in 1957